There were 18 karate events at the 2010 South American Games: 9 men's events and 9 women's events. The events were held over March 26–28.

Medal summary

Medal table

Medalists

References

Karate
South American Games
2010